The  was a small elite group of swordsmen that was organized by commoners and low rank samurai, commissioned by the  (military government) during Japan's Bakumatsu period (late Tokugawa shogunate) in 1863. It was active until 1869. It was founded to protect the shogunate representatives in Kyoto at a time when a controversial imperial edict to exclude foreign trade from Japan had been made and the Chōshū clan had been forced from the imperial court. They gained considerable fame in the Ikedaya incident and the August 18 coup events, among others. The men were drawn from the sword schools of Edo.

History

Japan's forced opening to the west in 1854, which required it to open its shores for trade or face military conflict, exacerbated internal political instability. Loyalists (particularly in Chōshū Domain) in Kyoto began to rebel. The  was a squad of 234  (samurai without masters) drawn from the sword schools of Edo.

The 's mission was to protect Tokugawa Iemochi, the 14th , during an important trip to Kyoto to meet with the Emperor Kōmei. There had not been such a meeting since the third  of the Tokugawa , Tokugawa Iemitsu, had visited Kyoto in the 17th century.

On March 26 (lunar calendar February 8), 1863, Kiyokawa led the  out of Edo as the vanguard of  Iemochi's procession to Kyoto, which they arrived on April 10 (lunar calendar February 23), 1863.

The members were disbanded and then returned to Edo where they would later form the  under the patronage of Shōnai Domain.

Founding members
Serizawa's faction:

 Serizawa Kamo
 Niimi Nishiki
 Hirayama Gorō
 Hirama Jūsuke
 Noguchi Kenji
 Araya Shingorō
 Saeki Matasaburō

Kondō's faction:

 Kondō Isami
 Hijikata Toshizō
 Inoue Genzaburō
 Okita Sōji
 Nagakura Shinpachi
 Saitō Hajime
 Harada Sanosuke
 Tōdō Heisuke
 Yamanami Keisuke

Tonouchi's faction:

 Tonouchi Yoshio
 Iesato Tsuguo
 Abiru Eisaburō
 Negishi Yūzan

At the time, Mibu was a village south west of Kyoto, and was the place where they were stationed.  was initially formed in three factions under Serizawa (the  group), Kondō (the  group) and Tonouchi. Abiru Eisaburō later died of illness, a month after arriving in Kyoto.

Matsudaira Katamori, after the careful evaluation of the political scene in Kyoto, felt it was needed to change the scope of the 's mission from protecting the shogunate to patrolling the streets of Kyoto and restoring order in the name of the Tokugawa .

The opposition forces included the Mori clan of the Chōshū and the Shimazu clan of Satsuma.

The  were led by Serizawa Kamo ( 1830, Mino Province), Niimi Nishiki, and Kondō Isami ( 1834, Musashi Province – he came from a small dojo in Edo called ). The  submitted a letter to the Aizu clan, another powerful group who supported the Tokugawa regime, requesting permission to police Kyoto. The request was granted.

Saeki Matasaburō, having killed Araya Shingorō, was believed to be killed by a Chōshū samurai Kusaka Genzui on September 22, 1863.

On September 30, 1863 (lunar calendar August 18), the Chōshū (anti-Tokugawa) clan were forced from the imperial court by the Tokugawa, Aizu and Satsuma clans. The  were sent to aid the Aizu and guard the gates of the imperial court. The opposition forces included the Mori clan of the Chōshū and the Shimazu clan of Satsuma.

Serizawa's erratic and disruptive behavior in Kyoto eventually led to Matsudaira Katamori of Aizu giving the  an order to assassinate Serizawa and his group. On October 19, 1863, Niimi Nishiki, a member of the Serizawa faction was forced by Yamanami Keisuke and Hijikata Toshizō to commit seppuku for breaking regulations. On October 30 (or October 28), a few selected  members led by Hijikata went into the Yagi Gennojō's house and assassinated Serizawa, his woman Oume, and Hirayama Goro, with Hirama Jūsuke being the only survivor who fled that night. All this infighting left Kondō as leader. Three months later, Noguchi Kenji was ordered to commit  for an unknown reason.

On July 8, 1864, in an incident at the Ikedaya Inn in Kyoto, thirty  suppressed a cell of twenty Chōshū revolutionaries, possibly preventing the burning of Kyoto. The incident made the squad more famous and led to soldiers enlisting in the squad.

Squad hierarchy after Ikedaya
 : Kondō Isami, fourth master of the Tennen Rishin-ryū
 : Yamanami Keisuke
 : Hijikata Toshizō
 : Itō Kashitarō
 Spies: Shimada Kai and Yamazaki Susumu.

:

 Nakazawa Koto (instructor in Kenjutsu)
 Okita Sōji (instructor in Kenjutsu).
 Nagakura Shinpachi (instructor in Kenjutsu).
 Saitō Hajime (instructor in Kenjutsu).
 Matsubara Chūji (instructor in Jujutsu).
 Takeda Kanryūsai (instructor in military strategies).
 Inoue Genzaburō
 Tani Sanjūrō (instructor in spearing skills).
 Tōdō Heisuke
 Suzuki Mikisaburō
 Harada Sanosuke

Members of the group

At its peak, the  had about 300 members. They were the first samurai group of the Tokugawa era to allow those from non-samurai classes (farmers and merchants, for example) to join. Many joined the group out of a desire to become samurai and be involved in political affairs. However, it is a misconception that most of the  members were from non-samurai classes. Out of 106  members (among a total of 302 members at the time), there were 87 samurai, eight farmers, three merchants, three medical doctors, three priests, and two craftsmen. Several of the leaders, such as Sannan, Okita, Saitō, Nagakura, and Harada, were born samurai.

regulations
In addition, if the leader of a unit was mortally wounded in a fight, all the members of the unit must fight and die on the spot and, even in a fight where the death toll was high, the unit was not allowed to retrieve the bodies of the dead, except the corpse of the leader of the unit.

Uniform

The  wore a light chainmail suit beneath their robes and a light helmet made of iron.

Thus the colour, in the samurai's eyes, characterized an honourable death. The  sleeves were trimmed with "white mountain stripes", resulting in a very distinctive uniform.

Boshin War
The new emperor had been named the head of a new government (meaning the end centuries of military rule by the ). This marked the beginning of the Boshin civil war.

On March 29, 1868, the  resisted an attack by the Imperial forces at the Battle of Kōshū-Katsunuma for about two hours but lost, with eight dead and more than thirty wounded, while the Imperial forces had only one dead and twelve wounded. The surviving members were scattered and retreated to Edo.

Right after the Battle of Kōshū-Katsunuma, Nagakura Shinpachi,  Harada Sanosuke and some of the members left the  after disagreements with long-time comrades Kondo and Hijikata and later formed a new unit  with a former Tokugawa retainer Haga Gidou as its commander.

On April 11, 1868, the  departed Edo again and set up a temporary headquarters at the Kaneko family estate, northeast of Edo. They would later move to a new headquarters in Nagareyama on April 25, 1868.

However, on the same day, the Imperial forces' Staff Officer Kagawa Keizō of Mito Domain received news that an armed unit had set up camp at Nagareyama and dispatched the forces there.

Death of Kondō Isami
During their training at Nagareyama on April 26, 1868, the  members were caught by surprise by the 200-strong Imperial forces, the Imperial forces' vice-chief of staff Arima Tota of Satsuma Domain ordered Kondō to go with them to their camp at Koshigaya. Kondō was later brought to Itabashi on April 27 for questioning. Kondō was declared guilty of participation in the assassination of Sakamoto Ryōma on April 30, 1868 and was beheaded three weeks later at the Itabashi execution grounds on May 17, 1868.

Battle of Aizu
Due to Hijikata being incapacitated as a result of the injuries sustained at the Battle of Utsunomiya Castle in May 1868, the  fought in defense of Aizu territory under Saitō Hajime in the Battle of Shirakawa in June 1868. After the Battle of Bonari Pass in October 1868, when Hijikata decided to retreat from Aizu, Saitō and a small group of  parted with Hijikata and continued to fight alongside the Aizu Domain  against the Imperial forces until the very end of the Battle of Aizu, where he and a handful of surviving members were apprehended and became the prisoners-of-war.

Joining with the Republic of Ezo
In December 1868, Hijikata and the rest of the surviving  joined the forces of the Republic of Ezo in the north.

The  numbers decreased to around one hundred in this period and they fought on despite the fall of Edo and clear defeat of Tokugawa. In the Battle of Miyako Bay on 6 May 1869, Hijikata led a daring but doomed raid to steal the imperial warship , in the early morning, from the  warship, a number of oppositionists, including Nomura Risaburō, managed to board the ship, but were soon mowed down by its Gatling gun. The battle lasted only thirty minutes and the survivors and  retreated to Hakodate.

On the fourth week of May 1869, Hijikata led 230 Republic of Ezo forces and the surviving  against the 600 strong Imperial forces during the Battle of Futamata for sixteen hours and were forced to retreat. The Imperial forces attacked again on the next day, only to retreat. On the following night, Hijikata led a successful raid on the Imperial forces' camp, forcing them to flee. Hijikata and his forces would later retreat to Hakodate on June 10.

End of the 
Hijikata was killed from a gunshot wound on June 20 (lunar calendar May 11), 1869, during the Battle of Hakodate in Hokkaido. Before his death, he wrote of his loyalty to the Tokugawa on the death poem sent by his page Ichimura Tetsunosuke to the house of his brother-in-law:

The forces of the Republic of Ezo would later surrender on June 27, (lunar calendar May 18), 1869, which marked the end of the Boshin War.

A few core members, such as Nagakura Shinpachi, Saitō Hajime, and Shimada Kai survived the war.

Monument

In popular culture
The  have become a staple of Japanese popular culture in general, and of period dramas in particular.

 The 1999 film Taboo depicted the  one year after the Ikedaya affair. The film shows the 's strict code and acceptance of homosexuality among the samurai members.
The 2003 manga,  or Goodbye  by Kenji Morita depicted the life of Hijikata Toshizō.
 The manga Peacemaker Kurogane by Nanae Chrono is a historical fiction taking place during the end of the Tokugawa period, following a young boy.
Their depiction however, being freely adapted for comedy purposes, was sometimes criticised for lacking historical precision.
The anime series Soar High!
The game series/anime series/anime movie franchise  follows a girl, looking for her lost father (a doctor who worked with the ). The premise mixes supernatural elements and fictional enemies and historical events. The  characters are fictionalized adaptations of the real members and retain their real names throughout the show.
 (2015) is a free-to-play collectible card browser video game developed by Nitroplus and DMM Games. In the  universe, the legendary swords, spears, and guns of famous warriors from Japan's feudal past are granted human form and come to life in a swashbuckling historical adventure. The swords of  heroes like Okita Souji, Hijikata Toshizo, and Isami Kondo are featured.
  ("Burn My Sword") is the name of a famous 1964 novel by Ryōtarō Shiba about the Boshin War (1868 to 1869 CE) from the point of view of Hijikata Toshizō. It is regarded by  fans as the 'bible' of  fiction and was the first literary work to focus on Hijikata; previously,  stories tended to focus on the commander Isami Kondo. His  fiction has not yet been translated into English; it is available in Japanese and Chinese.
  Japanese television  period drama was broadcast on TV Asahi in 1998.
The  appear in the mobile game Fate/Grand Order as one of two teams players can side with during the GUDAGUDA 2: Meiji Restoration event. Members of this team include Servant versions of Okita Souji and Hijikata Toshizo, which are both limited Servants.  is also the name of Toshizo's Noble Phantasm, which gets much stronger as his HP gets lower. Furthermore, in GUDAGUDA 5: Yamanataikoku, servant versions of 3 other members, Saitou Hajime, Keisuke Yamanami and Serizawa Kamo, are introduced, with Saitou Hajime and Keisuke Yamanami being currently playable.
 The  feature heavily in the plot of the 2014 video game . In this game, main protagonist Sakamoto Ryoma, a 19th-century doppelgänger of main series protagonist Kazuma Kiryu, becomes the group's third unit captain under the alias of Saito Hajime.
The  appears in the app . Players are confrontations to  members by Koi Koi.
 In the manga Golden Kamuy and its anime adaptation, Hijikata appears as the leader of one of the contending groups trying to locate a cache of gold on Hokkaido soon after the Russo-Japanese War. He would have been in his seventies at the time the story takes place.

 See also 
 Battotai
 Ishin shishi
 Ryōtarō Shiba
 Samurai
 Hwarang

 Further reading 
 Stephane Lun 倫世豪. A Guide on Shinsengumi: the background and management. 2021 Kindle Paperwhite version. Amazon.com
 Ryōtarō Shiba, Moeyo Ken 燃えよ剣(Burn My Sword). 1972 
 Ryōtarō Shiba, Shinsengumi Keppu Roku 新選組血風錄 (Shinsengumi: Chronicles of Blood and Tempest). 2004 
 Hillsborough R. Shinsengumi: the Shogun's last samurai corps. 2005 .
 Hillsborough R. Samurai sketches: from the bloody final years of the shogun. 2001 
 Kikuchi A. 菊地明 and Aikawa T. 相川司. Shinsengumi Jitsuroku 新選組実錄". Chikuma-shobō 筑摩書房, Tokyo 1996.
 Ōishi M. 大石学. Shinsengumi: Saigo no Bushi no Jitsuzō 新選組：最後の武士」の実像. Chūōkōron-shinsha 中央公論新社, Tokyo, 2004.
 Sasaki S. 佐々木克. Boshin sensō: Haisha no Meiji ishin'' 戊辰戦争 : 敗者の明治維新. Chūōkōron-shinsha 中央公論社, Tokyo,1977.

Notes

References

External links 

 SHINSENGUMI 新選組 Shinsengumi Website
 Hajimenokizu A site dedicated to Saitou Hajime and the Shinsengumi in various fictional and historical incarnations.
 Samurai archives – Shinsengumi

 
Boshin War
Japanese warriors
Meiji Restoration
Defunct law enforcement agencies of Japan
1863 establishments in Japan
Japanese words and phrases